Alan Louis Barelli (20 May 1920 – 3 May 2008) was an Australian rules footballer who played for the Hawthorn Football Club in the Victorian Football League (VFL).

Personal life
Anderson served as a lance corporal in the Australian Army during the Second World War.

Notes

External links 

1920 births
2008 deaths
Australian rules footballers from Melbourne
Hawthorn Football Club players
Australian Army personnel of World War II
Australian Army soldiers
People from Mitcham, Victoria
Military personnel from Melbourne